Yarnell is an unincorporated historic locale in Lane County, Oregon, United States. It was located about 5 miles south of Mohawk, in the Mohawk Valley.

Yarnell was a station on the now-defunct Marcola line of the Southern Pacific Railroad. It was established in 1901, and was likely named for Jere Yarnell, a local resident listed as living in the area in the 1880 census. There was a Yarnell covered bridge about a mile north of the station that carried Hill Road over the Mohawk River. The bridge was built in 1916 and demolished in 1958. In 1915 there was a Yarnell School.

References

External links
Historic images of The Yarnell Covered Bridge from Salem Public Library
Images of Yarnell from Flickr
Mohawk Valley history, including several items about Yarnell
History of the Southern Pacific Wendling-Mohawk branch from Abandoned Railroads of the Pacific Northwest

1901 establishments in Oregon
Populated places established in 1901
Former populated places in Lane County, Oregon